Bromelia tubulosa is a plant species in the genus Bromelia. This species is native to Venezuela.

References

tubulosa
Flora of Venezuela